Jevne may refer to:

Jevne (surname)
H. Jevne & Co., an early grocery store in California, United States
Jevne State Park, a state park in northern Minnesota, United States
Jevne Township, Aitkin County, Minnesota, United States